Unit A of the Climber Motor Car Factory is a historic industrial building at 1823 East 17th Street in Little Rock, Arkansas.  It is a large wood-frame structure, topped by a gabled monitor roof.  Its walls are concrete block for the bottom , and wood frame between concrete pillars above.  The building was constructed in 1919 for the Climber Motor Company, the only automobile manufacturer founded in the state, and was the only part actually built of a planned multi-building complex.  The company manufactured automobiles here until 1924, after which it was used by Command-Aire to build light aircraft, and by the Great Northern Paper Company to manufacture toilet paper.

The building was listed on the National Register of Historic Places in 2005.

See also
National Register of Historic Places listings in Little Rock, Arkansas

References

Industrial buildings and structures on the National Register of Historic Places in Arkansas
Industrial buildings completed in 1919
National Register of Historic Places in Little Rock, Arkansas
Motor vehicle manufacturing plants on the National Register of Historic Places
Transportation buildings and structures on the National Register of Historic Places in Arkansas
1919 establishments in Arkansas